Elio García-Austt (1919-2005) was born in Montevideo. Uruguay, and was a neuroscientist.

Beginnings in Montevideo
García-Austt's father was a Professor of Psychiatry at the School of Medicine in Montevideo and was a member of the Parliament.

García-Austt graduated with honors as "Doctor en Medicina y Cirugía" (M.D.) at University of the Republic in 1948 and obtained a gold medal, with a doctoral thesis on "Repercussion of some metabolic alterations on the bioelectric potentials". Even before his graduation, he had started his career as a neuroscientist, developing clinical electroencephalography at the Instituto de Endocrinología using the first recording equipment that existed in Uruguay in 1942.

After his graduation, he continued his job as clinical neurophysiologist and published his first papers on epilepsy. His clinical career continued with the foundation and direction of five clinical electroencephalography laboratories at Montevideo's public hospitals. 

García-Austt's interest in basic scientific research on neurophysiology arose at the Department of Physiology of the Medical School of Montevideo, under the direction of the Nobel Prize laureate Dr. Corneille Heymans. During García-Austt's extended stay in Montevideo at postwar time. García-Austt claimed that his relationship with Professor Heymans was fundamental for the start of his career as neurobiologist.

In 1951, he worked in the Neurophysiology Laboratory of the Pontifical Catholic University at Santiago de Chile, directed by Prof. Joaquin Luco, one of the most important neurobiology scientists. Back in Montevideo, he started the "Laboratorio de Neurofisiología" in collaboration with Drs. E. Migliaro and J.P. Segundo. This laboratory was under the joint jurisdiction of the Biophysics and Physiology Departments.

In this Neurophophysiology Laboratory, a set of neurobiological researchers was trained. Those researchers continued his works in different laboratories in Uruguay and foreign countries. At this school, García-Austt set up an Integral Course of the Nervous System which included faculty from the physiology, biophysics, histology, anatomy and pharmacology departments.

In 1959, García-Austt created the Neurophysiology Laboratory at the "Instituto de Neurología y Neurocirugía" of the School of Medicine. He worked until 1973, when he moved to Spain. The laboratory's research included:
Evoked potentials in humans and their relationship with attention and perception;
 Regulating mechanisms of sensory, auditive, visual and somesthetic inputs;
 Recording and electrical stimulation during brain surgery in humans;
 Oxygen pressure variation during sleep; 
 Physiology and physiopathology of the intracranial pressure. This research created a procedure for the diagnosis of normotensive hydrocephalia..

During this period, the research works was financed largely by foreign grants.

Madrid

In 1973 he was invited by Jose M. Rodriguez Delgado to work in Madrid, Spain, collaborating in the development of Neurobiology at the Hospital "Ramon y Cajal" of Social Security.  He accepted it, both because of the better facilities and because of the unbearable socio-political climate in Uruguay. At that hospital he founded the Experimental Neurology Service of the Research Department. For 15 years, he worked on the generating mechanisms of brain rhythms. He was connected with the Hospital clinical area, via the collaboration with the Neurochirurgical Unit led by Dr. Obrador-Alcalde. As professor in the Department of Physiology of the School of Medicine of the Universidad Autonoma in Madrid, he taught Neuroscience, in close collaboration with Professors Rodriguez Delgado and Reinoso Suarez.

Garcia-Austt and the Spanish Neurosciences Society

Preliminary scientific meetings named I, II and III Spanish Neurobiologists Meetings in 1980, 1981 and 1983, organized by Garcia-Austt in collaboration with  Reinoso Suarez, Salvador Lluch, and Isabel de Andres, lead to the creation,  of the Spanish Neurosciences Society, in 1985, in which Garcia-Austt was the first President.

Return to Montevideo

In 1988 he returned to Montevideo to direct the "Proyecto de Neurociencia", financed by the European Union, their first scientific grant given to Latin America. The grant provided the basis for the development of five projects in several Uruguay laboratories. This marked a revival of the neuroscience in Uruguay, thanks to the integrating and formative work of Garcia-Austt, creating a favourable scientific environment for the return of several researchers who worked in foreign countries. During this period he returned frequently to Madrid, in which he maintained his office at the Ramon y Cajal Hospital. In Uruguay, he continued in the organization of several national and international courses which formed the present structure of the "Escuela de Neurociencia" in Hispanic America.

In 1991 he was designed Professor of Neuroscience of the School of Sciences of the University of Uruguay, a position which he held until his retirement in 1999.

He married two times and had five sons. He died in Montevideo in 2005.

Positions

Associated Professor of Physiology, Facultad de Medicina de Montevideo, 1959-1974.
Chief of "Servicio de Neurología Experimental", Departamento de Investigación, Centro Especial “Ramón y Cajal”, Madrid, 1977-1989.
Professor ad honorem, School of Medicine, Universidad Autónoma de Madrid, 1974.
"Professor Especial", School of Medicine, Universidad Autónoma de Madrid, 1975-1988.
"Professor Emérito", School of Medicine, Uruguay, 1986.
"Professor Honorífico", Hospital Ramón y Cajal, Madrid, 1990.
Professor of Neurosciences, Facultad de Ciencias, Uruguay, 1991–1999
Director of the Instituto de Biología, Facultad de Ciencias, Uruguay, 1991-1994.
"Professor Emérito", Facultad de Ciencias, Uruguay, 1998.
"Doctor Honoris Causa", Universidad, Uruguay, 2000.

References 

1919 births
2005 deaths
Uruguayan neuroscientists
People from Montevideo
Uruguayan expatriates in Chile
Uruguayan expatriates in Spain
University of the Republic (Uruguay) alumni
Academic staff of the University of the Republic (Uruguay)
Uruguayan people of Spanish descent
Uruguayan people of German descent